The Grand Comoro drongo (Dicrurus fuscipennis) is a species of bird in the family Dicruridae. It is endemic to Comoros.

The bird is glossy black with some matte brown contrasts and a forked tail. It is approximately 24 cm long and has a black bill and legs. It feeds on fruit and large insects such as cockroaches, grasshoppers, beetles and mantes.

Its natural habitats are subtropical or tropical moist lowland forests, pastureland, and plantations. It is threatened by habitat loss.

References

Grand Comoro drongo
Endemic birds of the Comoros
Grande Comore
Grand Comoro drongo
Taxonomy articles created by Polbot